Enemy State clauses is a term used to refer to article 107 and parts of article 53 of the United Nations Charter. They are both exceptions to the general prohibition on the use of force in relation to countries that were part of the Axis.

Under article 107 States are allowed to take enforcement action "as a result of" World War II against "any State which during the Second World War has been an enemy of any signatory to the present Charter", while under article 53 regional arrangements directed against the renewal of aggressive policy by a former enemy State aren't required to seek Security Council authorization before taking measures to prevent further aggression.

Both provisions are considered to have fallen into desuetude after the conclusion of peace treaties and the admission to the UN of all former enemy States. While Germany and Japan have advocated for the deletion of these clauses from the Charter the removal so far hasn't taken place due to the complex amendment process.

See also 
 United Nations
 UN Charter
 United Nations Security Council
 Axis Powers

References 

Charter of the United Nations
International law
International relations
Aftermath of World War II in Germany
Aftermath of World War II in Japan
1945 in politics